Seward Mountains may refer to:

 Seward Mountains (Antarctica)
 Seward Mountains (Alaska)
 Seward Mountain (New York)
 Seward Mountains (New York)